is a train station of West Japan Railway Company (JR-West) in Kasagi, Kyoto, Japan. The station is outside of the ICOCA service area, so no IC cards can be used to pay fares.

Lines

Layout
The station has an island platform serving two tracks. The station building and the platform are connected by stairs. A coin locker is installed.

Platforms

Passenger statistics
According to the Kyoto Prefecture statistical book, the average number of passengers per day is as follows :

Surrounding area
 Kasagiyama Prefectural Natural Park

See also
 List of railway stations in Japan

External links

  

Railway stations in Kyoto Prefecture